Dembnė (formerly) is a village in Kėdainiai district municipality, in Kaunas County, in central Lithuania. According to the 2011 census, the village had a population of 1 person. It is located 3 km from Šlapaberžė, by the Barškupis river and the outskirts of Kalnaberžė Forest.

History
At the beginning of the 20th century, Dembnė was a village and Gedgaudai family estate in Surviliškis volost.

Demography

References

Villages in Kaunas County
Kėdainiai District Municipality